The Hits is a compilation album by American R&B group Jagged Edge. It includes their biggest singles, plus a few album tracks from their 2006 self-titled release, which had been released six months earlier. It was released on November 21, 2006.

Track listing
 "Good Luck Charm" - 4:24
 "Promise" - 4:06
 "Let's Get Married" - 4:24
 "Walked Outta Heaven" - 4:31
 "Where the Party At" (Dupri Remix) (featuring Jermaine Dupri, Da Brat, R.O.C., Lil' Bow Wow & Tigah)
 "He Can't Love U" - 4:04
 "I Gotta Be" - 3:28
 "Hopefully" - 3:42
 "Let's Get Married" (Remarqable Remix) (featuring Jermaine Dupri & Run Of Run DMC)
 "Stunnas" (featuring Jermaine Dupri) - 3:47
 "Season's Change" (featuring John Legend) - 3:46

Jagged Edge (American group) albums
2006 greatest hits albums
Albums produced by Jermaine Dupri